Here is a comprehensive list of Laurence Fishburne's stage, film, television, video game, and music video credits.

Stage

Film

Television

Audio dramas

Video games

Music videos

See also 
 List of awards and nominations received by Laurence Fishburne

References 

Male actor filmographies
American filmographies